Theodor Julius Jaffé (August 17, 1823 – April 11, 1898) was a German actor.

Life

Julius Jaffé was born in Berlin to the Jaffé family. His father was a Jewish merchant who wanted his son to become a lawyer. However, since he had a fine bass, he decided to become a singer and studied with Kugler and Joseph Elssler in Berlin, then with Giovanni Gentiluomo in Vienna. In 1844 he appeared as an opera-singer in Opava, Austrian Silesia, and then in Lübeck, Halle, Magdeburg, and Cologne. In 1847 he abandoned opera and became an actor. He filled engagements in Bremen (1847–49), Weimar (1849–53), Breslau (1853–56), and in Braunschweig. In 1864 he went to Dresden as successor to Dawison, and was the leading actor of the royal theater there for thirty  years. In 1894 he retired with the honorary degree of professor. He took every opportunity to visit the leading German theaters of Europe. He died in Dresden.

He celebrated his stag night on 13th May 1851 with Franz Liszt.

The image shown is from his grave, salvaged after damage from World War II bombing. This grave plaque was sculpted by Carl Seffner.

Performances
 Nathan der Weise, Richard III, Shylock, Iago, Franz Moor, Philipp II., Carlos, Tartuffe, Mephistopheles,  etc.

References

1823 births
1898 deaths
19th-century German male actors
German male stage actors
19th-century German Jews
Male actors from Berlin
People from the Province of Brandenburg